The Source (also known as The Secret Craft in the United Kingdom and The Surge on DVD in the United States) is a 2001 film directed by S. Lee Taylor and starring Mathew Scollon, Melissa Renée Martin, Edward DeRuiter, and Alice Frank. The story concerns four teenagers who obtain superhuman powers allowing them to control others.

Plot
The film opens by following a moody goth named Reese, who befriends three other outcasts like him: Zack, a rich nerd; Ashley, Zack's sister; and Phoebe, a flower child.  They go to a forest and find a glowing rock. They gain powers from just stepping into its presence, and they use these powers to intimidate and humiliate people who have made fun of them over the years. Zack gains telepathy, Phoebe gains telekinesis/psychokinesis, Ashley gains speech-induced psychic suggestion, and Reese gains the ability to heal or hurt others/himself using his mind.

However, her power goes to Ashley's head; and she begins to take over the school, using mind control. She attacks her brother Zack and tries to kill Phoebe and Reese. They force her to heal Zack, but she forces Phoebe to levitate off the building and drop to the ground. Reese (because of his ability to heal or hurt) takes his own hearing away, when Ashley tries to control him; and he breaks the piece of the rock she had around her neck. He heals Phoebe; but, when they return to destroy the glowing rock, it has disappeared. Ashley is committed to a mental institution; but a former teacher brings her more of the glowing rock. The movie ends with her eyes turning blue, indicating that her powers have returned.

Main cast
Mathew Scollon as Reese Hauser 
Melissa Reneé Martin as Ashley Bainbridge 
Edward DeRuiter as Zack Bainbridge 
Alice Frank as Phoebe Lewis 
Johnny Venocur as Jerry Hauser 
Ronald Rezac as Principal McKinley 
Roger Kristian Jones as Moss Man 
Steven Glinn as Raimy 
Mark Wood as Mr. Jessup 
David Castro as Lane 
Paul Taviani as Mr. Bartlett 
Anna DeCardi as Miss Dunn 
David Anders as Booji (as David Holt) 
Cory Travalena as Bane 
Aaron Deakins as Pugg

Distribution
The film was released in the United Kingdom, under the title, "The Secret Craft", on March 11, 2002 via Third Millennium, while it retained its original title for its television airings on The Horror Channel. In the United States, the film carried the alternative title, "The Surge", for VHS and DVD, with both formats being made available on September 17, 2002 from Alchemy''.

References

External links

2002 films
2002 science fiction films
The Asylum films
2000s English-language films
2000s American films